Sahason is a Market in Allahabad, Uttar Pradesh, India.

References

Villages in Allahabad district